Hatzalah is one of several Jewish volunteer emergency medical service (EMS) organizations serving mostly areas with Jewish communities around the world, giving free medical service no matter their religion. Most local branches operate independently of each other, but use the common name. The Hebrew spelling of the name is always the same, but there are many variations in transliteration, such as Hatzolah, Hatzoloh, and Hatzola. It is also often called Chevra Hatzalah, which loosely translates as "Company of Rescuers", "Group of Rescuers", or "Rescue Squad". It is the largest volunteer medical group in the United States.

History 
The original Hatzalah EMS was founded in Williamsburg, Brooklyn, New York by Rabbi Hershel Weber in the late 1960s, to improve rapid emergency medical response in the community, and to mitigate cultural concerns of a Yiddish-speaking, Hasidic community. The idea spread to other Orthodox Jewish neighborhoods in the New York City area, and eventually to other regions, countries, and continents. Hatzalah is believed to be the largest volunteer ambulance service in the world. Chevra Hatzalah in New York has more than a thousand volunteer EMTs and paramedics who answer more than 70,000 calls each year with private vehicles and a fleet of more than 90 ambulances.

Hatzalah organizations now function in Argentina, Australia, Austria, Belgium, Brazil, Canada, Israel, Mexico, Panama, Russia, South Africa, Switzerland, United Kingdom, Ukraine, and in 10 states in the US: California, Connecticut, Florida, Illinois, Maryland, Michigan, New Jersey, New York, and Pennsylvania. Hatzalah branches are currently being organized in other states as well.

In Israel, there are two Hatzalah organizations operating on the national level: United Hatzalah, and Tzevet Hatzalah (Hebrew: צוות הצלה). While United Hatzalah is inarguably the larger of the two organizations, in the past their volunteers were limited to direct response on-scene care, versus Tzevet Hatzalah volunteers, which are additionally licensed and authorized to provide emergency transport utilizing Magen David Adom ambulances. Currently United Hatzalah -  has a wide deployment of actives ambulances and several Mobiles Intensive Care Units (always staffed by a specialist doctor and a paramedic) distributed in the greatest cities of Israel, which allows them to transport sick and injured to the nearest suitable medical center, for free.

Operations 

Hatzalah uses a fly-car system, where members are assigned ad-hoc to respond to the emergency. The dispatcher requests any units for a particular emergency location. Members who think they will have best response times respond via handheld radios, and the dispatcher confirms the appropriate members. Two members will typically respond directly to the call in their private vehicles. A third member retrieves an ambulance from a base location.

Each directly dispatched Hatzolah volunteer has a full medical technician "jump kit" in their car, with oxygen, trauma, and appropriate pharmaceutical supplies. Paramedic (EMT-P) members carry more extensive equipment and supplies, including EKG, IV, injection, intubation, and other pharmaceuticals.  Each volunteer is called a unit (as in, a crew of one) and is assigned a unit number that starts with a neighborhood code, followed by a serial number for that neighborhood (e.g., "Q-120" means "Queens unit number 120"). Ambulances also have unit numbers in the same format, with the first few numbers for each neighborhood reserved for the ambulance numbers. Some neighborhoods have begun to assign 3-digit unit numbers to their ambulances, using numbers out of the range assigned to human member units (e.g., 900-numbers).

In some areas there may be periods where coverage is not strong enough, for example on a summer weekend. When this happens, coordinators may assign an on-call rotation. The rotation may still respond from their houses, or they may stay at the garage through their shift. In such periods, Hatzalah functions closer to a typical EMS crew setup, though the dispatchers may still seek non-on-call members to respond, and there will still often be a non-ambulance responder as first dispatched, even if that responder starts from the base.

In Israel, United Hatzalah relies upon mobile phone technologies which include an SOS app and a special emergency phone number, 1221, with messages to news organizations distributed by WhatsApp.

Response times 
Hatzalah's model provides for speedy first responder response times. Each Hatzalah neighborhood's response time varies. For example, in Borough Park, Brooklyn, daytime response in life-threatening emergency are between 1–2 minutes, and nighttime response times are 5–6 minutes. In the Beverly-La Brea neighborhood of Los Angeles, response times average at sixty-to-ninety seconds.
In Israel, the response time is under 3 minutes.

Organization 
Hatzalah is not a single organization. Each chapter operates autonomously, or, in some cases, with varying levels of affiliation with neighboring Hatzalah chapters and under a central association.

In New York City's Hatzalah, there is a very simple operational hierarchy. Usually, there are two or three members who are "coordinators", managing all operational aspects of the chapter.

As Orthodox Jews, many volunteers see each other daily during prayers, and especially on Shabbat. This allows them to remain organized, despite the lack of an extensive formal hierarchy.

The coordinators are responsible for recruitment, interaction with municipal agency operations (police, fire, and EMS), first-line discipline, and day-to-day operations. The coordinators often are responsible, directly or via delegation, for arranging maintenance crews, who are often called service members or service units, and for purchasing supplies, ambulances, and other equipment. There is also an administrative function, often separate from the coordinator function. The chief administrator is often called a director or executive director, and this is sometimes a paid position. All other positions in Hatzalah, including coordinators, are held by unpaid volunteers.

Most of the New York State branches have some centralized administration and dispatch functions, known as "Central Hatzalah", or, simply, "Central". The neighborhood organizations under Central are nevertheless independent. Most Hatzalah organizations pattern themselves after the Williamsburg and Central models (see operational descriptions below).

Formally, the New York City-area "Central Hatzalah" is called Chevra Hatzalah of New York. It combines dispatch and some other functions for over a dozen neighborhood organizations, including Williamsburg, Flatbush, Borough Park, Canarsie, Crown Heights, Lower East Side, Upper West Side, Midtown, Washington Heights, Queens, Rockaways & Nassau County, Seagate, Catskills, Staten Island, Riverdale, and others. As each of these areas is otherwise independent, each has its own fund-raising, management, garages, ambulances, and assigned members. Rockland County, NY and Kiryas Joel (Town of Palm Tree) branches have a centralized dispatch system as well, but their central organization is separate from the other New York State centralized functions, and they have a looser relationship with their New York State brethren, though there is a great deal of co-operation among them. Together, the combined New York State branches have grown to become the largest all-volunteer ambulance system in the United States.

In 2019, it was announced that NYC Hatzoloh, one of the largest volunteer ambulance corps in the country, would receive funding from the city council.

Within Israel, the largest local organization is Magen David Adom.

Outside of New York and Israel, there are many smaller Hatzalah organizations. Each of these operates as a self-contained unit as members of a single association, but with no centralized coordination. However, where there are other Hatzalahs nearby, there is often a great deal of co-operation.

In Baltimore, Hatzalah's response area straddles two jurisdictions; Baltimore City Fire Department and Baltimore County Fire Department. Members in Baltimore often work side by side with crews from both services.

Legal status 
In the United Kingdom, Hatzalah cannot use blue lights and sirens on their private vehicles.

In England, all Hatzalah chapters are CQC registered, and they have a memorandum of understanding with local police forces with regards to use of blue lights and sirens, if certain criteria are met. Like any other emergency service, this does not mitigate if a collision occurs, and the service and its members can be prosecuted if deemed to be in the public interest.

In New York, Hatzalah usually use red and blue lights and sirens, like normal unmarked emergency vehicles. In New Jersey, Hatzalah usually use blue lights.

In Florida on June 14, 2021 Governor Ron DeSantis made history by signing a new law that allowed faith-based volunteer ambulance services to operate in Florida. This law also allowed for the use of emergency lights and sirens in Hatzalah response vehicles. 

In Toronto, Hatzalah use green lights, having the same legal status as volunteer firefighters who also use green lights in their vehicles.

In Australia, Hatzalah are trained as Community First Responders and while they are tasked by the professional services to respond to emergencies, they cannot use flashing lights and/or sirens and must obey all traffic rules.

Community involvement 
Hatzalah organizations are often involved in other community activities, on top of their primary mission of emergency medical work. Many neighborhood chapters sponsor and participate in community events, both within the local Jewish community and in the broader community.

Flatbush Hatzalah frequently plays softball against teams from local police precincts, firehouses, and hospitals.

Many Hatzalahs worldwide run public relations campaigns related to safe drinking on Purim, fire safety on Chanukah, and during Passover preparations. Chevra Hatzolah in New York works closely with the FDNY on this matter.

Specialization of Hatzalah EMS 
A number of items that are either unique to Hatzalah, or that are relatively unusual for an EMS, include:

Direct response 

Most EMS rely on crews with scheduled shifts operating from a known location. Due to its members and the communities they serve usually living in proximity, Hatzolah relies little on scheduled crews and stations, and, rather, has all service members on call 24/7 and members responding from wherever they are.

Cultural sensitivities 
Language, religion, and culture barriers create challenges for an emergency medical service. Hatzalah is built to consider these challenges, especially with regard to Halacha (Jewish law) and communities that only speak Yiddish or Hebrew.

A Jew reluctant to violate Shabbat rules when receiving medical attention may be more at ease and easily convinced of the medical urgency when the EMT or paramedic is a fellow Orthodox Jew. A woman or girl worried about physical modesty and contact may be helped by knowing that a Jewish provider will be aware of the details of her concerns, and will act to reduce the problem as much as possible.

Cost 
In areas where the EMS charges a fee, lower income clientele lacking health insurance may have a reluctance to call for an ambulance, unless the evidence of urgency is overwhelming. A volunteer service, with less overhead costs, tends to reduce that reluctance. Hatzolah will often handle "check-out" cases, without charge. In this way, the true emergencies among those check-outs may be recognized and treated quickly, where the caller might have otherwise not sought treatment.

Patient advocacy 
In contrast with most other EMS agencies, many Hatzalah volunteers will remain at the hospital with the patient long after bringing them to the emergency department. This is especially true during serious cases, where volunteers will remain in order to help the patient and/or their families navigate the sometimes confusing series of events that occur during an emergency. Members will stay to explain, advocate, and sometimes help make arrangements to bring in other specialists or arrange transfer to higher care facilities.

Interaction with other agencies 
At times, there have been difficulties in dealing with outside organizations, including other first-responders.

On February 20, 2013, the Federal Communications Commission granted Chevrah Hatzalah's request for a waiver to obtain calling party numbers (CPN), even when callers have caller ID blocking. Calls to 911 are exempt from CPN blocking, but calls to Chevrah Hatzalah do not go through 911. Other Hatzalah dispatch numbers, including other New York State Hatzalah groups, do not have this waiver, but some are working on it.

In general, branches have excellent relations with state and local police and EMS.

An example of those operating in uneven, or otherwise especially challenging situations is Catskills Hatzolah, handling the swelling summer crowd.

Israel's United Hatzalah has shared its expertise with a group of Arab volunteers from East Jerusalem, to form an emergency first response unit called Nuran. The group since has been dismantled, and the volunteers were incorporated in United Hatzalah.

Magen David Adom 
United Hatzalah's relationship with Magen David Adom, however, is strained, and MDA has banned its members and volunteers from also volunteering in other rescue organizations, including Hatzalah.

The Chevra NYC Central affiliates boast an excellent relationship with New York City and New York State agencies.

Ezras Nashim  
Hatzalah was the subject of controversy as articles in the New York Post and JEMS Magazine criticize the organization for its discriminatory practice of not allowing women to join. A group of Orthodox women founded an organization called Ezras Nashim, an all-female Orthodox Jewish volunteer EMT ambulance service. They cited the need for modesty and sensitivity to the needs of fellow Orthodox women, with the goal of preserving women's modesty in emergency medical situations, especially childbirth: "This is a woman's job. Historically, women have always delivered babies in traditional Jewish values, pointing to the Hebrew Bible Book of Exodus, where the first midwives were women, Shiphrah and Puah. "In our community, women also have a very strong motivation to seek female doctors", said their lawyer, Rachel Freier, a Brooklyn Civil Court Judge and Haredi Orthodox Jewish mother of six.

Notable time periods

September 11, 2001 
Hatzalah members were among the first responders to the World Trade Center on September 11, 2001. Alongside other rescue workers, Hatzalah volunteers rescued, treated, and transported victims.

Hatzalah was not dispatched by the city's 911 system, and a print-out of the 911 job from FDNY EMS does not list them as responding units. However, audio recordings exist of Hatzalah's own dispatch, including members calling for help during the collapse of the first tower. There are also well-known photos of destroyed Hatzalah ambulances  and the destroyed cars of Hatzalah members, in the aftermath of the attack.
The Hatzalah units were also referred to in a memoir of 9/11 by responding NYC fireman Dennis Smith in his book Report From Ground Zero. On page 231 of the first edition, he wrote: "I met two guys from Engine 39. They brought me to EMS, the Hezbollah [sic] ambulance."  This was corrected in later editions.

COVID-19 pandemic 
Hatzalah chapters across the United States continued to service Jewish communities during the COVID-19 pandemic. The organization saw a 250% increase in emergency calls during the pandemic. In addition to medical response, Hatzalah worked with rabbis and community leaders to communicate to Jewish communities the need for self-isolation and the implementation of safety precautions. Multiple Hatzalah chapters donated ventilators and masks, as well as other vital personal protective equipment, to local hospitals in need of the equipment.

Surfside Building Collapse 
On June 24, 2021, (10 days after Governor Ron DeSantis signed the law that would allow Hatzalah in Florida to operate) at approximately 1:22 a.m. EDT, Champlain Towers South, a 12-story beachfront condominium in the Miami suburb of Surfside, Florida, United States, partially collapsed, causing the death of 98 people. Four people were rescued from the rubble, but one died of injuries shortly after arriving at the hospital. Eleven others were injured. Approximately thirty-five were rescued the same day from the un-collapsed portion of the building, which was demolished ten days later. Hatzalah of South Florida (HSF) was one of the first agencies on the scene providing triage care to survivors and families. HSF was on site for the duration of the rescue and recovery operation providing medical and rehab support to the IDF search and rescue team from the home front command as well as the out-of-town FEMA USAR teams.

Chapters 

Chapters of the organization exist in Argentina, Australia, Austria, Belgium, Canada, Chile, England, Israel, Mexico, Russia, South Africa, Switzerland, and in the United States. The chapters in each neighborhood or city operate independently, though in many cases, affiliations and levels of co-operation do exist between neighboring chapters.

See also 
Shomrim (literally, "Watchers"), neighborhood security force
Chaverim (literally, "Friends"), roadside assistance squads
Chesed Shel Emes (literally, "Kindness of Truth"), body recovery and burial assistance 
Misaskim (literally, "People who Get Involved"), services for the care of the dead and the needs of mourners
ZAKA or "Zihuy Korbanot Ason" (literally, "Disaster Victim Identification"), identification of victims of terrorist, accidents, or other disasters

References

External links 
 Hatzolah Kiryas Tosh of Canada
 United Hatzalah of Israel Official website
 Hatzolah Darom of Ashdod, Israel
 Hatzalah of Michigan
 Hatzolah of Los Angeles
 Hatzalah of Chicago
 Hatzalah of the Jersey Shore
 Hatzolah of Sydney, Australia
 Chevra Hatzolah of Melbourne, Australia
 Chevra Hatzolah of Mexico City
 Hatzolah of Johannesburg, South Africa
 Hatzolah of Zurich, Switzerland
 Hatzolah of Antwerp, Belgium
 Hatzola Manchester, England
 Hatzola Edgware, England
Hatzolah Emergency Air Response Team, Inc. (Hatzolah Aviation Division) 
 

Ambulance services
Ambulance services in the United States
Ambulance services in Australia
Emergency services in Israel
First aid organizations
Jewish medical organizations
Volunteer search and rescue organizations
Ambulance services in the United Kingdom
International volunteer organizations